Santa Rosa Mountains may refer to the following mountains in the United States of America:
Santa Rosa Mountains (Arizona)
Santa Rosa Mountains (California)
Santa Rosa (mountain), a mountain peak in the Peruvian Andes

See also
Santa Rosa Hills, disambiguation
Santa Rosa Range, northern Nevada
Santa Rosa and San Jacinto Mountains National Monument